Gilbert Beesby (fl. 1382–1401) was an English merchant, mayor and Member of Parliament from Lincoln.

Beesby was Bailiff of Lincoln in September 1371 – 1372, and Mayor of Lincoln in 1380–81.

He was a Member of the Parliament of England for Lincoln in 1382, 1388 and 1401.

References

14th-century births
15th-century deaths
14th-century English businesspeople
Members of the Parliament of England (pre-1707) for Lincoln
Mayors of Lincoln, England
English MPs October 1382
English MPs September 1388
English MPs 1401